Olipa Myaba Chiluba is a politician in Malawi.

Chiluba represents Mzimba North East in the National Assembly of Malawi. Chiluba's term began on May 20, 2014.

See also
Politics of Malawi

References

Living people
Members of the National Assembly (Malawi)
21st-century Malawian politicians
Year of birth missing (living people)